Anton Drexler (13 June 1884 – 24 February 1942) was a German far-right political agitator for the Völkisch movement in the 1920s. He founded the pan-German and anti-Semitic German Workers' Party (DAP), the antecedent of the Nazi Party (NSDAP). Drexler mentored his successor in the NSDAP, Adolf Hitler, during his early years in politics.

Early life
Born in Munich, Drexler was a machine-fitter before becoming a railway toolmaker and locksmith in Berlin. He is believed to have been disappointed with his income, and to have played the zither in restaurants to supplement his earnings. Drexler did not serve in the armed forces during World War I because he was deemed physically unfit for service.

Politics

During World War I, Drexler joined the German Fatherland Party, a short-lived far-right party active during the last phase of the war, which played a significant role in the emergence of the stab-in-the-back myth and the defamation of certain politicians as the "November Criminals".

In March 1918, Drexler founded a branch of the Free Workers' Committee for a Good Peace (Der Freie Arbeiterausschuss für einen guten Frieden) league. Karl Harrer, a journalist and member of the Thule Society, convinced Drexler and several others to form the Political Workers' Circle (Politischer Arbeiter-Zirkel) in 1918. The members met periodically for discussions about nationalism and antisemitism.

German Workers' Party
Together with Harrer, Drexler founded the German Workers' Party (DAP) in Munich on 5 January 1919.

At a DAP meeting in Munich in September 1919, the main speaker was Gottfried Feder. When Feder's lecture concluded, Adolf Hitler – who attended the meeting as part of his assignment from the German Army to watch political agitators – got involved in a heated political argument with a visitor, Professor Adalbert Baumann, who questioned the soundness of Feder's arguments in support of Bavarian separatism and against capitalism. In vehemently attacking the man's arguments, Hitler made an impression on the other party members with his oratory abilities, and according to him, the professor left the hall acknowledging defeat. Drexler approached Hitler and gave him a copy of his pamphlet My Political Awakening, which contained anti-Semitic, socialist, anti-capitalist ideas. Hitler claims the literature reflected the ideals he already believed in. Impressed with Hitler, Drexler encouraged him to join the DAP. On the orders of his army superiors, Hitler applied to join the party.

Once accepted, Hitler began to make the party more public by drawing people in with his speaking abilities, leading up to his organizing the party's biggest meeting yet, which attracted 2,000 people to the Hofbräuhaus in Munich on 24 February 1920. It was in this speech that Hitler, for the first time, enunciated the twenty-five points of the German Worker's Party's manifesto that he had authored with Drexler and Feder. Through these points he gave the organisation a foreign policy, including the abrogation of the Treaty of Versailles, a Greater Germany, Eastern expansion, and exclusion of Jews from citizenship. On the same day the party was renamed the National Socialist German Workers' Party (Nationalsozialistische Deutsche Arbeiterpartei; NSDAP).

Following an intraparty dispute, Hitler angrily tendered his resignation on 11 July 1921. Drexler and the members of the party's governing committee realised that the resignation of their leading public figure and speaker would mean the end of the party. So Dietrich Eckart was asked by the Party leadership to speak with Hitler and relay the conditions in which he would agree to return. Hitler announced he would rejoin the party on the condition that he would replace Drexler as party chairman, with dictatorial powers and the title of "Führer", and that the party headquarters would remain in Munich. The committee agreed and he rejoined the party as member 3,680. Drexler was thereafter moved to the purely symbolic position of honorary president and left the party in 1923.

Drexler was also a member of a völkisch political club for affluent members of Munich society known as the Thule Society. His membership in the Nazi Party ended when it was temporarily outlawed in 1923 following the Beer Hall Putsch, although Drexler had not actually taken part in the coup attempt. In 1924 he was elected to the Bavarian state parliament for the Völkisch-Social Bloc party (VSB), in which he served as vice president until 1928. He played no role in the Nazi Party's re-founding in February 1925 and rejoined only after Hitler ascended to national power in 1933. In May 1925 he founded a group with other VSB deputies, the Nationalsozialer Volksbund (National Social People's League), but was dissolved in 1927-1928. Drexler received the Nazi Party's Blood Order in 1934, and was still occasionally used as a propaganda tool until about 1937, but was never allowed any power within the party.

Death
Drexler died in Munich in February 1942 after a lengthy illness due to alcoholism.

References

Bibliography

External links
Mein politisches Erwachen; aus dem Tagebuch eines deutschen sozialistischen Arbeiters  München, Deutscher Volksverlag 4th ed.

1884 births
1942 deaths
German anti-capitalists
German anti-communists
German Workers Party members
German Fatherland Party politicians
German nationalists
Nazi Party officials
People from the Kingdom of Bavaria
Political party founders
Politicians from Munich
Right-wing anti-capitalism
Thule Society members
Alcohol-related deaths in Germany